Gowling Lafleur Henderson LLP (Gowlings) was a Canadian and international law firm, with about 700 legal professionals in 10 offices in Canada and as well as London, Moscow, and Beijing. The firm offered legal support in business law, advocacy/litigation and intellectual property law.

On July 8, 2015, Gowlings announced that they would amalgamate with UK firm Wragge Lawrence Graham & Co to create a new international law firm called Gowling WLG. The new firm launched in February 2016.

History
Gowlings' originated with the firm Henderson & McVeity, which was founded in Ottawa in 1887. Its name passed through numerous permutations, but included references to the lawyers Gordon Gowling, George and Gordon Henderson. In the 1980s, the firm expanded beyond its traditional Ottawa base, establishing offices in Toronto, Kitchener, and Moscow.

Starting in the mid-1990s, Gowlings created a national platform through a succession of mergers with other law firms in Vancouver, Hamilton, Calgary, Montreal and Toronto. The firm eventually adopted the simple brand name "Gowlings" (which had long been in informal use).

Notable firm members 

Leonard Walter Brockington (1888–1966).  Founding chairman of the CBC, 1936-1939
Gordon F. Henderson (1912–1993).  President of the Canadian Bar Association, 1979–1980; Chancellor of the University of Ottawa, 1991–1993
Roy McMurtry (1932–  ). Attorney-General of Ontario, 1975–1985 and Chief Justice of Ontario, 1996-2007
Ray Hnatyshyn  (1934–2002).  24th Governor-General of Canada, 1990–1995
Ian Scott  (1934–2006). Attorney-General of Ontario, 1985–1990
Donald Mazankowski  (1935–  ). Deputy Prime Minister of Canada, 1986–1993
Martin Cauchon  (1962–  ). Minister of Justice (Canada) and Attorney General of Canada, 2002–2003 ; Minister of National Revenue (Canada), 1999-2002
Lawrence Cannon (1947–  ). Minister of Foreign Affairs (Canada), 2006–2008 and Stephen Harper's former Quebec lieutenant
Frank Marrocco . Associate Chief Justice (2005–) of the Ontario Superior Court of Justice ,

References 

Defunct law firms of Canada